This is a list of lighthouses in Palau.

Lighthouses

See also
 Lists of lighthouses and lightvessels

References

External links
 

Palau
Lighthouses
Lighthouses